The 2003 Jade Solid Gold Best Ten Music Awards Presentation was held in January 2004. It is part of the Jade Solid Gold Best Ten Music Awards Presentation series held in Hong Kong.

Corruption incident
In 2003 Hong Kong's anti-corruption unit ICAC launched an investigation on TVB as a number of people have been bribing the music industry to win awards.    Some of the individuals arrested include Juno Mak, and his father, Clement Mak, who was the chairman of CCT Telecom.  Probes were launched after murmurings that TV execs, music company bosses & a singer & his father were involved in backroom dealings that gave music awards not according to merit but on personal connections.  Juno was booed by the public when accepting the award. Juno, his father and other industry figures including EEG chairman Albert Yeung were arrested at some stage.

Top 10 song awards
The top 10 songs (十大勁歌金曲) of 2003 are as follows.

Additional awards

Notes

http://www.inovasisolution.com - solid gold

References

 Top ten songs award 2003, Tvcity.tvb.com
 Additional awards 2003, Tvcity.tvb.com

Jade Solid Gold Best Ten Music Awards Presentation, 2003